Judge Sullivan may refer to:

Emmet G. Sullivan (born 1947), judge of the United States District Court for the District of Columbia
Eugene R. Sullivan (born 1941), judge of the United States Court of Appeals for the Armed Forces
George F. Sullivan (1886–1944), judge of the United States District Court for the District of Minnesota
Jerry Bartholomew Sullivan (1859–1948), judge of the United States Customs Court
John Sullivan (general) (1740–1795), judge of the United States District Court for the District of New Hampshire
Philip Leo Sullivan (1889–1960), judge of the United States District Court for the Northern District of Illinois
Richard J. Sullivan (born 1964), judge of the United States Court of Appeals for the Second Circuit

See also
Justice Sullivan (disambiguation)